Ring 2 is a 1999 Japanese horror film.

Ring 2 may also refer to:

Roads
 Ring II, in Finland
 Ring 2 (Aarhus), in Denmark
 Ring 2 (Copenhagen), in Denmark
 Ring 2 (Oslo), in Norway

Other uses
 The Ring Two, a 2005 American horror film
 Ring 2 (computer security)

See also

 Spiral (Suzuki novel), the second Ring novel
 Two rings (disambiguation)
 Ring Ring (disambiguation)
 Ring (disambiguation)